Asin Station is a station on the Gyeongui-Jungang Line.

References

External links
 Station information from Korail

Metro stations in Yangpyeong County
Seoul Metropolitan Subway stations
Railway stations opened in 1959